is a 2005 Japanese drama film directed by Kichitaro Negishi and based on a novel by Shō Narumi.

Synopsis
Manabu Yazaki had left his family's home in Hokkaidō years before to go to Tokyo to earn a degree, start a company and get married. Now, divorced and pursued by creditors, he returns to his home and the family he has ignored for so many years. He loses the last of his money on a ban'ei horse race, a local sport where huge draft horses compete while pulling sleighs. Now broke, Manabu finds a job at the stable run by his brother Takeo. There he meets two women, Haruko, who helps Takeo run the stable, and Makie, the jockey who seems to have lost her touch. He also finds Unryu at the stable, the horse that cost him his money at the ban'ei, and who may be heading for the slaughterhouse.

Cast
 Yūsuke Iseya as Manabu Yazaki
 Kōichi Satō as Takeo Yazaki
 Kyōko Koizumi as Haruko Tanaka
 Kazue Fukiishi as Makie Shudo
 Teruyuki Kagawa as Ogasawara
 Kippei Shiina as Kurokawa
 Yukiyoshi Ozawa as Sutō
 Masahiko Tsugawa as Ozeki
 Denden as Tamotsu Fujimaki
 Hiroshi Yamamoto as Tetsuo Kato

Release
What the Snow Brings played at the Tokyo International Film Festival in October 2005 and was released theatrically in Japan on May 20, 2006. In September 2007, it had a showing at the 2007 Raindance Film Festival.

Awards
18th Tokyo International Film Festival
 Won: Tokyo Sakura Grand Prix
 Won: Audience Award
 Won: Best Director – Kichitaro Negishi
 Won: Best Actor: – Kōichi Satō

28th Yokohama Film Festival
 Won: Best Supporting Actress – Kazue Fukiishi

31st Hochi Film Awards
 Won: Best Director – Kichitaro Negishi

References

External links

Reviews
 

2005 films
Films directed by Kichitaro Negishi
Films based on Japanese novels
2000s Japanese films